The Atlantic City Sandpipers were an American basketball team based in Atlantic City, New Jersey that was a member of the American Basketball League.

The team did not complete the first half of their only season, dropping out on December 21, 1936.

The team is likely related to the Atlantic City Sand Snipers of the Eastern Basketball League.

Year-by-year

Atlantic City, New Jersey
Basketball teams in New Jersey
Basketball teams established in 1936
Basketball teams disestablished in 1936
1936 establishments in New Jersey
1936 disestablishments in New Jersey